De Smet or Desmet may refer to:

People
De Smet (surname)

Places
De Smet, South Dakota, a town in Kingsbury County, South Dakota, United States
De Smet, Idaho, a town in Benewah County, Idaho, United States
De Smet, an unincorporated community in Missoula County, Montana, United States

Other uses
Desmet method, a method for restoring the colours of early silent films

De Smet Jesuit High School, Creve Coeur, Missouri, United States
DeSmet (boat), a passenger boat in Glacier National Park